Christopher A. Iannella Jr. (born November 6, 1952) is an American attorney and politician, currently serving as a member of the Massachusetts Governor's Council.

Early life and education 
Iannella was born in Boston, Massachusetts. He graduated from Boston College and Suffolk University Law School.

Career 
After graduating from law school, Iannella practiced law in Boston. He served as a member of the Massachusetts Governor's Council from 1985 to 1990 and again starting in 1993. Iannella is a Democrat.

Personal life 
Iannella's father, Christopher A. Iannella, served in the Massachusetts General Court and the Boston City Council.

References

External links
 Electoral history

1952 births
Living people
Lawyers from Boston
Boston College alumni
Suffolk University Law School alumni
Massachusetts Democrats
Members of the Massachusetts Governor's Council